Ahn Dong-goo (born November 2, 1993) is a South Korean actor and model. He is known for his roles in dramas When the Weather Is Fine, Soul Mechanic, The Wind Blows and Sweet Home.

Biography and career
He was born on November 2, 1993 in South Korea. He attended Hanyang University to study theater. After he graduated from Hanyang University with BA in theater and film chemistry, he joined Ace Factory. In 2019 he made his acting debut in drama The Wind Blows. In 2020 he appeared in drama When the Weather Is Fine and Soul Mechanic. The same year he appeared in drama Sweet Home as Lee Soo-woong. He appeared in movie Subject, he starred as Hyun-sung which left a strong impression on the audience at the 'Mise-en-scene's Short Film Festival' and the movie was shown at 24th Bucheon International Fantastic Film Festival and The 19th Mise-en-scene Short Film Festival which received favorable reviews.

Filmography

Film

Television series

Web series

References

External links
 
 

1993 births
Living people
21st-century South Korean male actors
South Korean male models
South Korean male television actors